Douglas Leonard Booth (5 May 1889 – 2 October 1956) was an architect, surveyor and civil engineer based in Beeston, Nottinghamshire.

Life
He was born on 5 May 1889 in Nottingham the son of Thomas Booth (b. 1855) and Elizabeth Collier (b. 1852).

He married Edith Lilian Hobson (1891–1981), daughter of T.K. Hobson, lace manufacturer of Glenville, Oakleys Road, Long Eaton, on 31 July 1915 at the Wesleyan Central Church, Long Eaton, Derbyshire and they had two children:
Douglas Thomas Booth (1916–1986)
Stanley Morley Booth (1924–1994)

He was elected to Beeston and Stapleford Urban District Council in 1937 for the ward of Beeston South and in 1943 he was elected chairman. In 1944 he was elected a councillor for Nottinghamshire County Council.

He died on 2 October 1956 at 6 Lilac Grove, Beeston and left an estate valued at £5,122 6s 7d.

Works
Garage, 18 Devonshire Avenue, St John's Grove, Beeston 1910
House, 4 Devonshire Avenue, St John's Grove, Beeston 1913
2 Houses, Elm Avenue St John's Grove, Beeston 1913
House 159 Station Road, Beeston 1913
House for W. Beecroft, Denison Street, Beeston 1914
17 Chilwell Road, Beeston 1929 (Alterations and additions)
Club premises for the Beeston Old Boys Association, Middle Street, Beeston 1926
28 houses, Henry Road, Beeston 1930
12 houses, Henry Road, Beeston 1930
2 shops, 246–248 (originally 49–51) Queen’s Road, Beeston 1930
3 pairs of houses, Lower Road, Beeston 1934
2 pairs houses, Brookland Drive, Chilwell 1935
Garage of Mr Peters, 21 Dovecote Lane, Beeston 1935
Pair of houses, Humber Road South and Beacon Road, Beeston 1936

References

1889 births
1956 deaths
Architects from Nottingham